Baila is a Sri Lankan music genre.

Baila or Baïla may also refer to:

Places
 Baïla, a Senegalese village
 Băila, a Romanian commune that includes the village of Băila

Music
 "Baïla", a single by the French boy band Alliage from their album Alliage l'album  
 "Bailá Bailá", a 2021 song by Swedish singer Alvaro Estrella
 "Baila Baila Baila", a 2019 song by bu Puerto Rican singer Ozuna, as lead single from his third studio album Nibiru
 "Baila Conmigo" (Selena Gomez and Rauw Alejandro song), 2021

See also
 Baila Conmigo (disambiguation)
 Baila Morena (disambiguation)
 
 "Bailamos", a Latin pop song from singer Enrique Iglesias
 Bailando (disambiguation)